McConkie Tauasa is a former Samoa international rugby league footballer who played as a  or on the .

He played for the Windsor Wolves in the New South Wales Cup and was contracted to the Penrith Panthers in the NRL.

References

External links
 Windsor Wolves profile
 Rugby League Project stats

Living people
Windsor Wolves players
Samoa national rugby league team players
Samoan rugby league players
Rugby league wingers
Rugby league centres
Year of birth missing (living people)